Gladiolus 'Charming Beauty' is a cultivar of Gladiolus which features soft pink blossoms with a white throat. Its eye-catching flowers (up to 7 per stem) grow on loose spikes (2-3 spikes per corm) that are adorned by narrow, deep-green sword-shaped leaves.

See also 
 List of Gladiolus varieties

References
Jardins Sans Secret

Charming Beauty
Ornamental plant cultivars